A low-emission vehicle is a motor vehicle that emits relatively low levels of motor vehicle emissions. The term may be used in a general sense, but in some countries it is defined in air quality statutes.
Different groups of people ("go greens", "go with the flow" and "no greens") show different interest in low emission vehicles

See also

 Partial zero-emissions vehicle
 Super-ultra-low emission vehicle 
 Ultra-low-emission vehicle
 United States emission standards 
 Zero-emissions vehicle

References

Green vehicles

ar:سيارة بلا عادم
de:Zero Emission Vehicle
es:Vehículo de cero emisiones
fr:Véhicule propre
ja:低公害車
pt:Veículo zero emissões